Yuri Pavlovich Vorontsov (23 March 1937 – 20 December 2002 ) was a Soviet cinematographer. His film credits include 1993's You Are My Only Love and the 1996 German film Hölle zu Hölle (From Hell to Hell).

Honored Artist of Russia (1994).

Filmography

Notes

References

External links

Biography of Yuri Vorontsov 

1937 births
Mass media people from Saint Petersburg
2002 deaths
Soviet cinematographers
Russian cinematographers